Martín Alfonso de León (c. 1220before April 1272) was an illegitimate son of Alfonso IX of León by Teresa Gil de Soverosa, a Portuguese noblewoman, daughter of Gil Vasques de Soverosa and María Aires de Fornelos, also mistress of King Sancho I of Portugal with whom she had a son and daughter.

Life 
The relationship between King Alfonso IX and Teresa began in 1218 and lasted until the king's death. They had one son, Martín, and three daughters, Sancha, María and Urraca, all born between 1218 and 1230, the year of Alfonso's death.

One of his first appearances in contemporary documentation was on 13 January 1243 at the Monastery of Santiago de Ermelo, in Bueu, Galicia, when he and his mother Taresia Egidii sold some property to a Martín Fernández and his wife. He and his wife María Méndez are recorded often in the cartulary of the Monastery of Sancti Spíritus in Salamanca which they founded in March 1268 with the support of Paio Peres Correia, Grand Master of the Order of Santiago, one of the few monasteries of the order reserved solely for women. They made many donations for its founding, including lands in Galicia, León, and Portugal, requesting to be buried there.

Martín appears for the last time in the documentation of this monastery on 3 November 1269. On 17 April 1272, María made another donation stating that she was a widow. On 27 May 1273, King Alfonso X of Castile confirmed to the municipality of Sancti-Spíritus all the fueros as a favor to the monastery that, as he mentions, María Méndez had built in Salamanca and where Martín Alfonso, "son of the King of León" was buried.  María is mentioned for the last time in June 1279 when King Alfonso X, at her behest, exempted the inhabitants of the town and the monastery from payment of several taxes, also allowing the nuns who entered the monastery to bring their properties, under certain conditions.

Marriage 
Martín Alfonso only had one wife, María Méndes, daughter of Mem Gonçalves de Sousa (Menendo González de Sousa in Spanish) and Teresa Alfonso de Meneses, with whom he had no issue.

Francisco de Rades y Andrada, a Spanish 16th-century historian, misinterpreted Pedro Afonso, Count of Barcelos who had written that Martín Alfonso's grandfather, Gil Vasques de Soverosa had married three times: firstly with María Aires de Fornelos; secondly with Sancha González de Orbaneja; and, for the third time to María González Girón, having issue with all three wives.  Rades y Andrada, erroneously, attributed the second and third wives to Gil Vasques de Soverosa's grandson, Martín, that is, he married the grandson to two of the grandfather's wives. A later genealogist, Ulloa Golfín, invented a son for Martín Alfonso and his supposed wife, María González Girón, known by the name of Gil Alfonso de León who never existed, either as a son of Gil Vázquez or of his grandson Martín, and who is claimed to be an ancestor of the Mogollón family of Extremadura.

References

Sources

 
 
 
 
 

Spanish untitled nobility
1210 births
1270s deaths
Sons of kings